Michael Turner (born 6 December 1954) is a former Australian rules footballer who played 245 games for the Geelong Football Club in the Victorian Football League (VFL) from 1974 to 1988.

Michael "Micky" Turner grew up in Warrnambool and did his final years of high school at Monivae College in Hamilton. 

He followed in the footsteps of his father Leo Turner (1928-1997) in representing Geelong and played as a wingman and half forward. He was an All-Australian in 1979 and captained the club for three seasons between 1984 and 1986.  In 1982 he was Geelong's leading goalkicker with 40 goals.

In 1989, Turner signed on as captain-coach of Werribee in the Victorian Football Association.  In 1995 he was appointed by AFL Victoria to be the regional manager for the Geelong Falcons, responsible for the development of junior talent in the area.  In 2014 he completed his 20th year in the job and has helped make the Falcons one of the highest regarded junior development programs in Australia.

Turner is a wingman in Geelong's official 'Team of the Century'.

References

External links

1954 births
Living people
Australian rules footballers from Victoria (Australia)
Geelong Football Club players
Geelong Football Club captains
Werribee Football Club players
Werribee Football Club coaches
Warrnambool Football Club players
Victorian State of Origin players
All-Australians (1953–1988)
People from Warrnambool